Giuseppe Zenti (born 7 March 1947) is an Italian prelate of the Catholic Church. He has been the Bishop of Verona since 2007.

Zenti was born in San Martino Buon Albergo in the province of Verona on 7 March 1947. He studied for the priesthood at the seminary of  Verona and was ordained on 26 June 1971.

He continued his studies at the University of Padua and in 1975 received his degree in classical literature.

From 1974 to 1993 he taught at the minor seminary of San Massimo, becoming its vice rector 1989 and then pro-rector.

From 1993 to 1997 he was a parish pastor, first in Santa Maria Immacolata in Borgo Milano and then in Legnago. On 25 January 2002, he was named Vicar General of the Diocese.

Pope John Paul II named him Bishop of Vittorio Veneto on 3 December 2003. He received his episcopal consecration on 11 January 2004.

Pope Benedict XVI named him Bishop of Verona on 8 May 2007, and he was installed there on 30 June.

References

1947 births
Living people
Religious leaders from Verona
21st-century Italian Roman Catholic bishops